Jalal-e-Al-e-Ahmad Expressway is an expressway in Tehran. It starts from the end of Kordestan Expressway and Shahid Gomnam Expressway. It passes Chamran Expressway, Sheikh Fazl-allah Nouri Expressway and Yadegar Expressway and 
reaches Ashrafi Esfahani Expressway.

Expressways in Tehran